The Peru women's national cricket team represents the country of Peru in women's cricket matches.

In April 2018, the International Cricket Council (ICC) granted full Women's Twenty20 International (WT20I) status to all its members. Therefore, all Twenty20 matches played between Peru women and another international side after 1 July 2018 were a full WT20I.

Peru was part of the South American Women's Championships in August 2018 with Brazil, Chile and Mexico, but Peru's matches were not classified as WT20Is as not all of their players met the ICC residency requirements. Peru won one match and lost five to finish at the bottom of the table. Peru also played in the 2019 edition of the championship, this time with full WT20I status awarded to their matches.

Records and Statistics 

International Match Summary — Peru Women
 
Last updated 16 October 2022

Twenty20 International 

 Highest team total: 124/6 v. Mexico on 5 October 2019 at Lima Cricket and Football Club, Lima.
 Highest individual score: 53, Samantha Hickman v. Mexico on 5 October 2019 at Lima Cricket and Football Club, Lima.
 Best individual bowling figures: 3/23, Samantha Hickman v. Mexico on 5 October 2019 at Lima Cricket and Football Club, Lima.

T20I record versus other nations

Records complete to WT20I #1281. Last updated 16 October 2022.

See also
 List of Peru women Twenty20 International cricketers

References

Women's
Women's national cricket teams
Cricket